Marriott is Steve Marriott's debut solo album from 1976 and features a British and an American side, reflecting the make-up of the bands backing Steve Marriott. The British side includes former Humble Pie colleague Greg Ridley on bass and singing backing vocals.

Track listings
All tracks written by Steve Marriott unless otherwise noted
British Side
 East Side Struttin' (Marriott, Finn) – 4:47
 Lookin' for a Love (Alexander, Samuels) – 3:44
 Help Me Through the Day (Leon Russell) – 5:52
 Midnight Rollin' (Marriott, Stphens) – 3:30
 Wham Bam Thank You Ma'am (Marriott, Lane) – 3:57
American Side
 Star In My Life (Marriott, Wallace)– 3:31
 Are You Lonely For Me Baby (B.Burns) – 3:51
 You Don't Know Me (C. Walker, E.Arnold) – 4:55
 Late Night Lady (Marriott, Hinkley, Ridley) – 3:02
 Early Evening Light – 4:02

Personnel
 Steve Marriott – Lead vocals, Guitar
 Mickey Finn – Guitar on Track1-5
 David Spinozza – Guitar on Track10
 Ben Benay – Guitar on Track6-10
 Red Rhodes – Pedal Steel on Track6-10
 Greg Ridley – Bass Guitar on Track1-5, Backing vocals on Track1-10
 Dennis Kovarik – Bass Guitar on Track6-10
 Michael Baird – Drums on Track6-10
 Ian Wallace – Drums on Track1-5 , Percussion on Track6-10
 David Foster – Keyboards on Track6-10
 Ernie Watts – Saxophone on Track6-10
 Alan Estes – Congas on Track6-10
 Venetta Fields – Backing vocals on Track2,6-10
 Carlena Williams – Backing vocals  on Track2,6-10
 Maxayn Lewis – Backing vocals on Track2,6-10

References

1976 albums